Tabita Rezaire (born 1989, France) is a French new media artist of Guyanese and Danish descent, "health-tech-political" therapist, and "kemetic" and kundalini yoga teacher. She has presented her work at the Goodman Gallery in Johannesburg, Arebyte Gallery, London, the Athens Bienniale, MAXXI, Rome, and Artspace, Sydney. Her book is Conscience u.terre.ine. (2022)

Biography 
Tabita Rezaire grew up in Paris and studied economics there for her BA, at Paris Dauphine University, doing her final year at Copenhagen Business School in Denmark. She travelled to London, to study fashion and ended up doing a master's degree in research in artist moving Image at the Central Saint Martins College of Art and Design.  She then lived in Paris, Mozambique, and Johannesburg from 2014 through at least 2018.

In 2017, she was welcomed in residence by MeetFactory in Prague, where she began working with sound. She trained in the use of gongs. As of 2021, she is based in Cayenne, French Guiana.

Work 
Rezaire produces videos and digital works in which she frequently includes herself. The body is considered a technology in her work. Many of her works deal with concepts of race, intersectional politics and Afro-feminism.

Rezaire's video work Afro Cyber Resistance (2014) denounces the Western-centric nature of the Internet, and the form of white supremacism that is exercised through network control. It describes the Internet, like the world around it, as "exploitative, discriminatory, classist, patriarchal, racist, homophobic, coercive and manipulative". Rezaire viewed it a "a pamphlet and a call for the decolonisation of the internet."

Her first solo exhibition, Exotic Trade, was held in 2017 at the Goodman Gallery in Johannesburg. In it she showed Sugar Walls Teardown, Hoetep Blessings (both, 2016) and the Inner Fire series (2016–17), which included videos, an installation, and digitally produced self-portraits. She described the experience: 

Rezaire's work has been exhibited extensively including at Arebyte Gallery, London, 2019; Athens Bienniale, 2018; MAXXI, Rome; and Artspace, Sydney.

Other works
Peacful Warrior, 2015Sugar Walls Teardom, 2016Deep Down Tidal, 2017Premium Connect,'' 2017

Collaborations 
She works with Alicia Mersy in the artists duo Malaxa, based in Johannesburg and Tel Aviv. She is also a founding member of SENEB as well as the Johannesburg-based collective NTU, with Bogosi Sekhukhuni and Nolan Oswald Dennis. The latter group presented African plants that allowed viewers access to one's ancestors at Auto Italia in London. NTU also hosts an online platform with one access station in Seoul.

See also 

 Cyberfeminism
 Afrofuturism

References

External links 

Artist profile on Rhizome
NTU Exhibition Review
Interview on Studio International
Nolan Oswald's Dennis' Profile

Digital artists
French contemporary artists
1989 births
Living people